Bandy Farms Historic District, also known as the Theodore L. Bandy Farm and Joseph S. Bandy Farm, is a historic farm and national historic district located near Bandy's Crossroads, Catawba County, North Carolina. The district encompasses 3 contributing buildings. They are two nearly identical two-story brick farmhouses built in 1884 and 1887, and a one-story brick outbuilding.

It was added to the National Register of Historic Places in 1990.

References

Farms on the National Register of Historic Places in North Carolina
Historic districts on the National Register of Historic Places in North Carolina
Houses completed in 1884
Houses in Catawba County, North Carolina
National Register of Historic Places in Catawba County, North Carolina